George Burrell Tulloch (born 2 December 1938) was a Scottish footballer who played for Dumbarton, Falkirk, Arbroath, Stenhousemuir, Raith Rovers and Brechin City.

References

1938 births
Scottish footballers
Dumbarton F.C. players
Falkirk F.C. players
Arbroath F.C. players
Stenhousemuir F.C. players
Raith Rovers F.C. players
Brechin City F.C. players
Scottish Football League players
Living people
Association football forwards